Daniel Alexander Williamson (1823–1903) was a British artist, part of a group of Liverpool painters who were influenced by the Pre-Raphaelite style.

He lived and worked in London from 1849 to 1857, before returning north to the Lancashire village of Warton. He went on regular painting trips with fellow Liverpool artist, William Lindsay Windus.

Several of his oil paintings are in UK public art collections, including National Museums Liverpool.

See also
List of Pre-Raphaelite paintings - including the works of Daniel Alexander Williamson.

References

1823 births
1903 deaths
19th-century English painters
English male painters
20th-century English painters
Artists from Liverpool
Pre-Raphaelite painters
19th-century English male artists
20th-century English male artists